Sällskapet may refer to:

 Sällskapet (album), a debut music album by the eponymous Swedish band
 Sällskapet (band), a Swedish electronic rock music band
 Sällskapet (club), a Swedish gentlemen's club established in Stockholm in 1800
 Sällskapet till belöning för trotjänare, a non-profit prize-giving organisation in Sweden
 Sällskapet Du Londel, an alternative name for Du Londel Troupe in Sweden
 Välgörande fruntimmerssällskapet, Swedish women's charitable society